Lexington Market station may refer to:

Lexington Market station (Baltimore Light Rail)
Lexington Market station (Baltimore Metro Subway)

See also
Lexington Market
Lexington station (disambiguation)